USS Seid (DE-256) was an  of the United States Navy in service from 1943 to 1945. She was scrapped in 1947.

Namesake
Daniel Seid was born on 29 November 1918 in Brooklyn, New York. After receiving his A.B. degree from the University of California at Los Angeles, he enlisted in the United States Naval Reserve (USNR) at Long Beach on 10 September 1940, as Seaman second class. On 15 September 1940, he was assigned to preliminary flight training at the Naval Reserve Aviation Base, Long Beach. On 19 November 1940, he was appointed Aviation Cadet, USNR, and reported for training at the Naval Air Station, Pensacola, Florida, on 25 November 1940. Following additional training at the Naval Air Station Miami and appointment as Naval Aviator, he was commissioned Ensign, USNR, on 25 July 1941.

On 1 February 1942, he participated in the initial attack on Kwajalein Atoll, Marshall Islands. In the face of Japanese fighter opposition and heavy antiaircraft fire, he pressed his attack on the enemy installations on Roi Island until he was killed in action. He was posthumously awarded the Air Medal.

History
Seid was laid down on 10 January 1943 by the Boston Navy Yard; launched on 22 February 1943; sponsored by Mrs. George Seid, mother of Ensign Seid; and commissioned on 11 June 1943.

1943
Following shakedown training off Bermuda, the destroyer escort returned to Boston, Massachusetts, on 31 July 1943. On 16 August, Seid performed her first task for which she had been designed, in searching for an enemy submarine sighted by a Navy blimp off Cape Hatteras. The patrol was fruitless, however, and Seid returned to Norfolk, Virginia, 24 hours later.

At Norfolk, Seid served two weeks as a training ship for the crews of other destroyer escorts. On 24 August, she got underway in the screen which escorted eight troop transports to the Panama Canal Zone. The convoy arrived at Coco Solo, Canal Zone, on 30 August, and, after fueling, proceeded through Gatun Locks on 1 September. From Bora Bora, Society Islands, Seid steamed alone, reporting for duty to the 3rd Fleet Commander at Nouméa on 29 September.

On 21 October, Seid was escorting Stoney Point to Espiritu Santo. At approximately 2000 hours, a message was received from Stoney Point stating that she had just passed a man in the water. Upon returning to the point and illuminating the area with search lights, it was discovered that the man floating in the water was attached to Seid. Though surrounded by sharks and supported only by a life belt, the man was recovered uninjured. Upon questioning, it was learned that he had fallen asleep on the fantail and fell off the ship as she rolled.

On 5 December, Seid, approximately six miles south of Tulagi in the Solomons, made sound contact with a suspected submarine. An attack was made with hedgehogs, and the ship's course was altered to avoid passing over the pattern. The ship swung top slowly, however, for five seconds after the pattern hit the water, a violent underwater explosion knocked out Seid's sound gear. Seid then stayed clear of the area so as not to interfere with the sonic efficiency of other anti-submarine vessels. No further contact was made, and there was no evidence of damage to a submarine. After an hour's search, the ships proceeded to nearby Port Purvis on Florida Island.

1944 
 
On 1 January 1944, after repairs at Havannah Harbor, Efate, New Caledonia, Seid got underway to Nouméa and resumed her escort duties with the 3rd Fleet. A week later, she sustained severe damage to frames, longitudinals, and equipment during a typhoon. While serious, the damage was not sufficient to make the ship unseaworthy. Seid arrived at Port Purvis, Florida Island, on 23 January for storm damage repair.

Seid next resumed her escort duties to and from Guadalcanal, Espiritu Santo, Nouméa, Tutuba Island, Florida Island, Savo Island, and Rua Sura Island until 12 April when she received orders to proceed to Pearl Harbor. After a short stop in Hawaii, Seid got underway for the west coast, arriving at the Mare Island Navy Yard on 25 April.

On 8 June, Seid was engaged in conducting post-repair trials and in training. Collateral duties included training submarines and escorting carriers on training missions. During this time, from 4 to 23 July, Seid made one escort run from Pearl Harbor to Eniwetok and back.
 
On 8 August, Seid was attached to the Pacific Fleet Service Force and proceeded in convoy to Eniwetok, where she was assigned to the Commander, 3rd Fleet for hunter-killer antisubmarine operations on the 16th.
 
Seid stood into Ulithi Harbor, Caroline Islands, on 27 October. There, Seid was shifted to Task Force 57 for escort operations. On 1 November, the destroyer escort proceeded to Kossol Passage, West Caroline Islands, arriving the next day. On 3 November, Seid engaged in repair work which was completed on the 12th, in spite of a typhoon on the 7th.

1945 
On Christmas Day 1944, Seid proceeded to Peleliu Island and joined Task Unit 94.5.9, assigned to make the invasion of Fais Island. It was thought that the enemy had been broadcasting information on American ship movements from the small island.
 
Seid carried out anti-submarine patrols during the invasion. On 5 January 1945, the landing was successfully accomplished, and Seid returned to Kossol Passage to resume escort operations.

After an availability period from 1 to 10 February, Seid resumed escort duty. From 23 February to 2 March, Seid escorted a 47-ship convoy from Eniwetok to Ulithi.

On 27 March, Seid stood out of Saipan Harbor to escort Transport Squadron 15 to Okinawa Shima. Upon arrival at Okinawa on 1 April, Seid acted as anti-submarine screen for Task Unit 51.2.8 as they feigned landings on the southern tip of the island. On 4 April, Seid's sound gear became inoperative, and she was detached to proceed to Kerama Retto for repairs. While at anchor there on 6 April, the destroyer escort's crew shot down an attacking aircraft.
 
On 9 April, sonar repairmen determined that it would be impossible to repair Seid's equipment with the facilities at hand, and Seid was assigned to a patrol station north of Okinawa Shima. On 12 April, Seid was credited with the shooting down of four Japanese planes, at ranges from 50 to 3,000 yards. In one nine-minute period, the destroyer escort shot down two of them, while evading five aerial torpedoes.
 
On 21 May, after repairs at Apra Harbor, Guam, Seid reported to Commander, Submarine Force, Pacific Fleet. Assigned to Task Group 17.10, Seid operated out of Apra Harbor as escort and training ship for submarines for the remainder of the war.

On 18 September, 30 naval enlisted passengers and three officers reported on board as the ship was preparing to get underway for the United States. The destroyer escort arrived at San Pedro, Los Angeles, on 5 October, disembarked her passengers, and began preparation for decommissioning.

Decommissioning and fate 
 
Seid was decommissioned on 14 December 1945, and struck from the Navy List on 8 January 1946. Sold to the Pacific Bridge Co., San Francisco, California, in January of the next year, she was scrapped on 17 April 1947.

Awards 
Seid received two battle stars for World War II service.

References

External links
 
 

Evarts-class destroyer escorts
Ships built in Boston
1943 ships
World War II frigates and destroyer escorts of the United States